Karkan or Karakan or Korkan may refer to:

 Karkan,_Gilan , Bandar_e Anzali
 Karkan, East Azerbaijan
 Karkan, Fars
 Karkan, Hamadan
 Karkan-e Olya, Lorestan Province
 Karkan, Markazi
 Karkan-e Bala, Markazi Province
 Karkan-e Pain, Markazi Province